Spring Sing is an annual music competition held in May at UCLA's Pauley Pavilion. Touted as "UCLA's oldest and greatest musical tradition," the competition brings together UCLA students to perform as solo artists, duets, bands, and a cappella groups in front of an audience of over 8,000 UCLA students, alumni, faculty, staff and celebrity judges.

History
The competition began with only 11 groups and was performed on campus at UCLA's Royce Hall. In the beginning years, the competition was composed mainly of sorority singing groups, serenading their fraternity counterparts. The first of these groups to win the competition was a barbershop trio from the Phi Kappa Psi fraternity. During the 1940s, 1950s, and 1960s, the competition grew quickly and outgrew Royce Hall. It was then, that Spring Sing gained its popularity and notoriety within the Los Angeles and Orange County area, as it moved to the Hollywood Bowl. During these years, up to 5,000 Bruins, family, friends, and locals witnessed the competition each year. Also added to the mix were celebrity judges and masters of ceremonies - including Ronald Reagan in 1952. The competition peaked in the late 60s and took an eight-year hiatus during the 70s until student and alumni interest revived the event (on campus this time) in 1978. The first group to win in 1978 was the combined efforts of Sigma Kappa sorority and Alpha Tau Omega fraternity performing a 50's inspired spoof of fraternity and sorority life. In 1986, the UCLA Student Alumni Association took over the event and moved the event to the Los Angeles Tennis Center in 1989, eventually returning the competition back to its previous glory.

Today

Today, the competition has expanded from its original version of fraternity singing groups, to over 15 artists grouped in 6 different categories (Solo, Duet, A Cappella, Band, Production, Exhibition). Each category (save Exhibition) is judged and a winner is selected for each (from which an overall winner is chosen to receive the "Northern California Alumni Grand Sweepstakes Award").

In addition to the talent aspect of Spring Sing today, the overall production has been turned into entertainment with the inception of the Company - a group of UCLA students who perform skits, songs and parodies in between each act as a way of introducing the next act. According to their website, they are "a group of the most hilarious and creative people on this campus who live for the spotlight and the opportunity to make an audience crack up."

Past performers from Spring Sing include: Grammy nominated members of Maroon 5, who were defeated in 2000 by Barely Manilow, Tyrone Wells, and the Grammy Award winner Sara Bareilles. Bareilles won Spring Sing twice, in 2002 and 2003. In 2006, Mikey G and Dan from Danville won the award for best duet and Best Overall Entry - the duo went on to form the band, Lady Danville.  In 2007, Jarell Perry and the Ambassadors won the Las Doñas Award for Best Band Entry. Katie Boeck won the Mortar Board Award for Best Solo Entry and the Northern California Alumni Grand Sweepstakes Award for the Best Overall Entry in 2007, 2008, and 2009. Nasim Pedrad (Saturday Night Live) was a member of the Spring Sing Company in 2003.

Since its revival, Spring Sing was held at UCLA's Los Angeles Tennis Center, but due to the overwhelming demand and popularity of the show, it was moved in 2009 to a much larger venue, Pauley Pavilion, providing the opportunity for more to experience the cherished campus tradition. "Spring Sing 2009 Rock Pauley" made its return debut in Pauley Pavilion on May 8, 2009 and on May 14, 2010. Due to construction on Pauley Pavilion, Spring Sing returned to UCLA's Los Angeles Tennis Center on May 20, 2011. Spring Sing returned to the newly renovated Pauley Pavilion on May 17, 2013 to set a record-breaking attendance for the Student Alumni Association.

Due to the coronavirus pandemic, Spring Sing was moved online in 2020 and 2021. 
Spring Sing 2022 premiered in person at the Los Angeles Tennis Center on May 20, 2022 at 8PM PT.

Winners

Judges and masters of ceremonies
Celebrities have served as judges and master of ceremonies. They have included former President Ronald Reagan (1952), actor Jason Alexander, Fred MacMurray, conductor André Previn,   Christopher Gorham (Ugly Betty), Ryan Carnes (Desperate Housewives), Amber Stevens (Greek), Dr. Bill Dorfman (Extreme Makeover), Tatyana Ali (The Fresh Prince of Bel-Air), Sarah Drew (Grey's Anatomy) and Todd White, a member of the lead animation team for "SpongeBob SquarePants".

Others were actors Sean Astin, Ian Buchanan, Dennis Haskins, Andrew Keegan, Tina Majorino, Danica McKellar (The Wonder Years), and Patrick Renna. 2009 judges included model Janice Dickinson, actress Shelley Long, local KNBC-TV newscaster Ted Chen, and Melissa Joan Hart.

2012 – Bill Dorfman, Nikki Soohoo (The Lovely Bones), Lady Danville, DJ Felli Fel, Taylor Armstrong (Real Housewives of Beverly Hills), Thomas Ian Nicholas, Pentatonix, Michael Strahan, Candace Cameron Bure (DJ Tanner from Full House), Sara Bareilles

2013 – Paula Abdul (American Idol), Chord Overstreet (Sam from Glee), Mike Warren (Hill Street Blues), Jensen Ackles (Supernatural), Elisabetta Canalis, Beth Behrs (2 Broke Girls), Francia Raisa (The Secret Life of the American Teenager)

2014 – David Ravetch, Dr. Bill Dorfman, Ken Komisar, Johnathan Franklin, Fiona Gubelmann, Jonathan Bennett, Brett Davern, Raven-Symoné, Jordyn Wieber, and Dennis Quaid

2015 – Sophie Simmons, Kingsley, Jeanine Mason, 8ky 6lu - The Party President, Elaine Hendrix, Jonathan Bennett, Clayton Snyder, Shwayze, Beau Mirchoff, Kathy Bates

2016 – Brett Dier of “Jane the Virgin,” actress Alyson Stoner and Jim O'Heir of “Parks and Recreation,”

2022 – Gene Block, Merlyn Wood, Olly Sholotan, Abigail Barlow, Nigel Lythgoe OBE, Jim O'Heir, Dom McLennon, and Vincent Martella

The George and Ira Gershwin Award
In recognition of their contributions to American music and in honor of their gift to UCLA, the UCLA Student Alumni Association established the annual George and Ira Gershwin Award for Lifetime Musical Achievement in 1988. In 1936, George and Ira Gershwin adapted the title tune from their musical Strike Up the Band as a new Bruin fight song for the growing university.

Winners have included:

1988 Angela Lansbury
1989 Ella Fitzgerald
1990 Sarah Vaughan
1991 Ray Charles
1992 Debbie Allen
1993 Natalie Cole
1994 Mel Torme
1995 Bernadette Peters
1996 Tom Petty
1997 Randy Newman
1998 John Lee Hooker
1999 Diane Warren
2000 Frank Sinatra
2001 Clive Davis
2002 Stevie Wonder
2003 k.d. lang

2004 James Taylor
2005 Kenneth Babyface Edmonds
2006 Burt Bacharach
2007 Quincy Jones
2008 Lionel Richie
2009 Julie Andrews, actress and singer
2010 Sasan Ahoraian Memorial Tribute
2011 Brian Wilson
2012 Bruce Lundvall
2013 MC Hammer
2014 Alanis Morissette
2015 Anthony Kiedis
2016 The Who: Pete Townshend & Roger Daltrey 
2017 Ziggy Marley
2018 Linkin Park
 2019 None
 2022 Hans Zimmer

Lionel Richie said at Spring Sing 2008: "Forget about surviving 30 some-odd years in the music business; Lionel Richie survived 27 years of Nicole Richie".

Julie Andrews said at her award ceremony: "Go Bruins. Beat 'SC ... let the Gershwin tunes strike up the band to celebrate every one of those victories."

On May 3, 2019, singer-songwriter Don McLean was awarded the Gershwin Award. However, after it was revealed of McLean's previous domestic violence case and conviction in 2016, the Student Alumni Association rescinded the award on May 6, 2019.

Committee
Spring Sing is organized and executed each year by a committee of UCLA students of the Student Alumni Association (SAA) who are selected by the SAA Board of Directors and the UCLA Alumni Association advisors. There are 8 different positions on the Spring Sing committee. Each position carries with it specific responsibilities for the successful implementation of the show.

Company
One tradition of Spring Sing is Company, a collection of eight to thirteen students who help host with comedic sketches between performances. Usual topics include student life, popular culture, and notable events on campus or in general. Notable alumni of Company include Mikey Day and Nasim Pedrad.

References

Sources
 
 
 

Spring Sing
1945 establishments in California
Recurring events established in 1945